Iredaleoconcha caporaphe is a species of air-breathing land snails or semislugs, terrestrial pulmonate gastropod mollusks in the family Helicarionidae. This species is endemic to Norfolk Island.

References

Iredaleoconcha
Helicarionidae
Gastropods of Norfolk Island
Vulnerable fauna of Australia
Gastropods described in 1913
Taxonomy articles created by Polbot